Mount Marlay is a mountain in the Southern Downs Region, Queensland, Australia.

Geography 
Mount Marley is just to the north-east of the town of Stanthorpe. It is just over 910 metres above sea level, about 100 metres higher than the town.

History 
The mountain is probably named after Edward Marlay, a selector and tin miner, who purchased land in Stanthorpe in 1872.

References

Mountains of Queensland